Tut, in Iran, may refer to the following villages:

 Tut, Lorestan
 Tut, Markazi
 Tut, Razavi Khorasan
 Tut, Mehrestan, Sistan and Baluchestan Province
 Tut, South Khorasan
 Tut, Yazd

See also
 Tut-e Olya, Khuzestan Province
 Tut-e Sofla, Khuzestan Province
 Tut-e Lashkaran, Razavi Khorasan Province
 Tut-e Safar, Razavi Khorasan Province
 Tut-e Seyyed Mohammad, Razavi Khorasan Province